The Lingkhor is a sacred path, the most common name of the outer pilgrim circumambulation path in Lhasa.

Sources
Passport Books:Tibet -Shanggri-la-Press 1986

Religion in Lhasa
Tibetan culture
Tibetan Buddhism